Zbraslavec is a municipality and village in Blansko District in the South Moravian Region of the Czech Republic. It has about 200 inhabitants.

References

Villages in Blansko District